"Fish" is a song co-written and recorded by American country music singer Craig Campbell.  It was released in June 2011 as the second single from his self-titled debut album.  Campbell wrote this song with Arlos Smith and Ashe Underwood.

Content
The song's rhyming scheme implies the word "fuck", which is replaced at the last second by "fish" ("I had everything we needed in the back of my truck / Turns out my baby loves to fish").

Critical reception
William Ruhlmann of Allmusic described the song as "a single-entendre joke of the kind that hasn't been heard since that old sophomoric tune 'Shaving Cream'".

Matt Bjorke of Roughstock gave the single three stars out of five, saying that it "may not be deep or anything of that sort but it is perfect for summer time playlists and that ultimately makes it a successful single."

Music video
The music video was directed by Wes Edwards and stars the host of the World Fishing Network's Hookin' Up with Mariko Izumi, who plays his love interest.

Chart performance

Year-end charts

References

2011 singles
2011 songs
Craig Campbell (singer) songs
Songs written by Craig Campbell (singer)
Song recordings produced by Keith Stegall
Bigger Picture Music Group singles
Music videos directed by Wes Edwards